The Albany Independent School District is a school district based in Albany, Texas (USA). The district operates one high school, Albany High School.

Finances
As of the 2010–2011 school year, the appraised valuation of property in the district was $300,284,000. The maintenance tax rate was $0.104 and the bond tax rate was $0.006 per $100 of appraised valuation.

Academic achievement
In 2011, the school district was rated "academically acceptable" by the Texas Education Agency.  Forty-nine percent of districts in Texas in 2011 received the same rating. No state accountability ratings will be given to districts in 2012. A school district in Texas can receive one of four possible rankings from the Texas Education Agency: Exemplary (the highest possible ranking), Recognized, Academically Acceptable, and Academically Unacceptable (the lowest possible ranking).

Historical district TEA accountability ratings
2011: Academically Acceptable
2010: Academically Acceptable
2009: Recognized
2008: Recognized
2007: Recognized
2006: Recognized
2005: Academically Acceptable
2004: Recognized

Schools
In the 2011–2012 school year, the district had students in two schools.
Albany Junior/Senior High (Grades 7-12)
Nancy Smith Elementary (Grades PK-6)
2006 National Blue Ribbon School

See also

List of school districts in Texas
List of high schools in Texas

References

External links 
Albany ISD

School districts in Shackelford County, Texas
School districts in Stephens County, Texas